Tapinoma melanocephalum is a species of ant that goes by the common name ghost ant.
They are  recognised by their dark head and pale or translucent legs and gaster (abdomen).  This colouring makes this tiny ant seem even smaller.

Description

The antennae composes of 12 segments that thickens towards the tip. The antennal scapes exceeds the occipital border. The head and thorax is a dark brown colour while the gaster, legs and antennae are a milky white colour. Due to its small size and light colour, the ghost ant is difficult to see. Ghost ants are monomorphic and the thorax is spineless. The gaster is hairless, and has a back opening that is similar to a slit-like opening. The abdominal pedicel is formed upon a single segment that is usually unable to be seen due to the gaster, and the species do not contain a stinger. During development, this species undergoes three larval instars, which are all naked and fusiform, with reduced mouthparts.

The queens are similar in appearance to a worker, but the alitrunk (mesosoma) is enlarged. The queen measures  in length, making them the largest member of the colony. The male's head and dorsum is dark in colour, while the gaster is light in that may contain several dark marks. They are usually  in length.

Distribution and habitat
Due to how widespread the ghost ant is, the exact native range is not exactly known. However, the species is assumed to originate from the African or Oriental regions, seeing it is a tropical species. This has been proven considering the ghost ant cannot adapt to colder climates and are only confined to greenhouses and buildings that provide considerable conditions that allows the species to thrive, although a colony of ghost ants was discovered in an apartment block in Canada. One report has even stated the presence of ghost ants in isolated regions, with a colony being found in the Galapagos Islands. The ant is found in 154 geographical areas.

The species is a common pest in the United States, particularly in the states of Hawaii and Florida, although the species is expanding further north, even reaching Texas by the mid 1990s. They are commonly found in the southern parts of Florida, and is considered a key pest, along with several other invasive ant species. The earliest record of the ghost ant in the United States was in 1887, where the species was found in Hawaii. It was then recorded in Washington, D.C. in 1894. After these two records, the ghost ant would later be found in Maine, New York, Connecticut, Virginia, North Carolina, Georgia, Florida, Illinois, Michigan, Wisconsin, Minnesota, Iowa, Missouri, Louisiana, Texas, Kansas, New Mexico, Arizona, California, Oregon and Washington. Ghost ants can be found in the U.S. territories of Puerto Rico and the U.S. Virgin Islands.

References

External links

 Tapinoma melanocephalum on the UF / IFAS  Featured Creatures Web site

Tapinoma
Hymenoptera of Australia
Insects described in 1793
Taxa named by Johan Christian Fabricius